Samuel Williams (1826 – June 30, 1881) was an American newspaper editor and author of Welsh descent.  He was born in Utica, New York.
He worked for the Albany Evening Journal and San Francisco Evening Bulletin. After his death, his widow Elizabeth Balmer became the wife of William Barnes Sr.

References

Sources

William C. Bartlett, "Samuel Williams, Journalist", Californian 4 (October): 323-30
"Deaths", S.F. Evening Bulletin, July 1, 1881, p. 3

1826 births
1881 deaths
19th-century American newspaper editors
Year of birth uncertain